Novica Zdravković (21 July 1947 – 16 June 2021) was a Serbian folk singer. He was the younger brother of Toma Zdravković. He was married to Jelena and had a son and a daughter. Early in his career, he was known by his nickname Nole.
His son is Dušan Zdravković, also a folk singer, who inherited the singing talent from his father and his uncle.
Novica died on 16 June 2021, in Belgrade.

Discography

Novica Zdravković released the following full-length albums:
 Navik'o sam ja na noćni život (1986), as Nole Zdravković
 Bol bolujem (1989), as Nole Zdravković
 Ne verujem (1992)
 Pesme za Tomu (1992)
 Pijem još od juče (1995)
 Sve ja znam (1997)
 Splavovi (2000)
 Ambis mog života (2003)
 Kralj splavova (2004)
 Ovo je ludnica (2005)

References

1947 births
2021 deaths
Yugoslav male singers
Serbian folk-pop singers
20th-century Serbian male singers
Musicians from Leskovac
21st-century Serbian male singers